Anders Endreson Skrondal (28 July 1891  –  20 December 1968) was a Norwegian politician for the Liberal Party.

He was born in Øksendal.

He served as a deputy representative to the Norwegian Parliament from Møre og Romsdal during the terms 1945–1949, 1950–1953 and 1954–1957. From June 1952 to 1953 he sat as a regular representative, replacing Trygve Utheim who had died.

On the local level Skrondal was a member of Øksendal municipality council from 1928 to 1931, and later served as mayor in the periods 1934–1937, 1937–1940, 1945–1947 and 1951–1955.

References

1891 births
1968 deaths
People from Sunndal
Members of the Storting
Liberal Party (Norway) politicians
Mayors of places in Møre og Romsdal
20th-century Norwegian politicians